A tropical storm is a tropical cyclone that reaches maximum sustained winds between . The Japan Meteorological Agency (JMA) is the main weather forecasting agency in the Northwest Pacific basin, where it measures sustained winds by averaging wind speeds in a period of ten minutes. The basin is limited to the north of the equator between the 100th meridian east and the 180th meridian. This list does not include storms that are on severe tropical storm or typhoon intensity.

Background

The Northwest Pacific basin covers a vast area in the Pacific Ocean, located north of the equator, between 100°E and 180°E. Several weather agencies monitor this basin, however it is officially monitored by the Japan Meteorological Agency (JMA, RSMC Tokyo), who is responsible for forecasting, naming and issuing warnings for tropical cyclones. Unofficially, the Joint Typhoon Warning Center also monitors the basin, however these warnings measures 1-minute sustained wind speeds, comparing their scale to the Saffir–Simpson scale. The JMA uses a simpler scale on classifying tropical cyclones adapted by the ESCAP/WMO Typhoon Committee measuring 10-minute sustained wind speeds, ranging from a tropical depression, tropical storm, severe tropical storm and typhoon. Furthermore, the JMA divides the typhoon category into three sub-categories for domestic purposes – a strong typhoon, very strong typhoon and violent typhoon.

This article covers a list of systems developing in the Northwest Pacific basin that were classified by the JMA's category of a tropical storm. The category of a tropical storm ranges with 10-minute sustained winds of between 34 and 63 knots (63–117 km/h; 39–72 mph).

Systems
Key
 Discontinuous duration (weakened below 'Tropical storm' status then restrengthened to that classification at least once)
 Intensified past tropical storm intensity after exiting basin
Italicised rows indicate information that is operational. The storm's duration, wind speeds, or pressure could change after its post-analysis.

1977–1979

1980s

1990s

2000s

2010s

2020s

Climatology

See also

Typhoon
Pacific typhoon season
 Pacific typhoon season

References

External links
Japan Meteorological Agency

Tropical storms
WPAC TS